The Confederação Brasileira de Vela e Motor is the national governing body for the sport of sailing in Brazil, recognised by the International Sailing Federation.

History
Founded in 1934

Notable sailors
See :Category:Brazilian sailors

Olympic sailing
See :Category:Olympic sailors of Brazil

Offshore sailing
See :Category:Brazilian sailors (sport)

References

External links
 Official website
 ISAF MNA Microsite

Brazil
Sailing
 
Yachting associations
Sailing associations
1934 establishments in Brazil
Organisations based in Rio de Janeiro (city)